Keperveyem Airport  is an airport located in Keperveyem, in the Chukotka autonomous district of Russia.

Airlines and Destinations

See also
Kyrganay Range

References

External links

Airports built in the Soviet Union
Airports in Chukotka Autonomous Okrug
Airports in the Arctic